Duncan Ronald Leslie "Les" Borrack (born 25 April 1933) is a former Australian rules footballer who played with Geelong in the Victorian Football League (VFL).

Notes

External links 
		

Living people
1933 births
Australian rules footballers from Victoria (Australia)
Geelong Football Club players
Redan Football Club players